Arutua, or Ngaru-atua is an atoll in the Tuamotu group in French Polynesia. It is located 40 km SW of Rangiroa. The closest land is Apataki Atoll, only 16 km to the East.

Arutua Atoll has a roughly pentagonal shape. Length  , width  . Its lagoon is wide and deep with one navigable passage.
, Arutua had a population of 680 inhabitants. The main village is Rautini.  There is a small airport at Arutua which was opened in 1984.

Geographically Arutua belongs to the Palliser Islands (Îles Palliser) subgroup of the Tuamotus.

History
The first recorded European to visit Arutua Atoll was Jakob Roggeveen (who also first sighted Easter Island) in 1722.  British mariner Frederick Beechey touched at Arutua in 1826. He named this atoll "Cockburn Island".

Administration
This atoll is part of the commune of Arutua, which consists of Arutua, as well as the atolls of Apataki and Kaukura. The seat of the commune is the village Rautini. The commune is in the administrative subdivision of the Îles Tuamotu-Gambier.

Demographics

Table 1. Current population.

Table 2. Population over time.

Images and maps

References

Oceandots
- & History
Arutua Airport

External links

Arutua Atoll FP (EVS Islands)
Shuttle Image ISS014-E-5393 (Astronaut Photography)

Tuamotu Atolls List (Pacific Image)

Communes of French Polynesia
Atolls of the Tuamotus